Union Christian College was a small co-educational college located in Merom, Sullivan County, Indiana. Founded by the denomination called the Christian Church which eventually merged with the Congregational denomination which later joined with the Evangelical and Reformed Churches to form the United Church of Christ. It was one of the first co-educational colleges that allowed women to take any class that a man could take. Other co-educational colleges would only allow their women to study home economics, nursing, teaching, secretarial, etc. At UCC women could study to be doctors, lawyers, ministers, or home-makers. UCC was very progressive for its time. One of its most notable alumni was James M. Hamilton (class of 1890), who became the third president of Montana State University, serving from 1904 to 1919.

Union Christian College existed from 1859 until it closed its doors in 1924.
In 2016 Merom Conference Center separated from the IKC UCC. It now stands as its own entity, Merom Camp and Retreat Center. It holds 7+ faith-based camps in the summer, and IKC sponsored retreats in the Fall and the Spring, along with private events. It has open pool time for the citizens of Merom every Friday in the summer and helps feed and give checkups to its people year round. 
It was listed on the National Register of Historic Places in 1982.

References

University and college buildings on the National Register of Historic Places in Indiana
Buildings and structures in Sullivan County, Indiana
Educational institutions established in 1859
Educational institutions disestablished in 1924
Defunct private universities and colleges in Indiana
1859 establishments in Indiana
National Register of Historic Places in Sullivan County, Indiana